Saiyed Saghir Ahmad (born 1 July 1935) was a judge of the Supreme Court of India.

Early life

Justice Saghir had his early education in Christian College Lucknow. After passing the Intermediate examination, he went to Aligarh and obtained his BSc from Aligarh Muslim University. He returned to Lucknow to follow in his father’s foot-steps and joined the legal profession after obtaining a law degree  from the University of Lucknow.

Career
He enrolled as an Advocate of the Allahabad High Court on 6 December 1961. He practiced civil law before the Lucknow Bench. He became Standing Counsel of the Uttar Pradesh Government in 1976 and of the Northern Railway in 1971. He was appointed Additional Judge of Allahabad High Court on 2 November 1981 and permanent Judge on 30 December 1982. 

He was transferred to the Jammu & Kashmir High Court on 1 November 1993. He was appointed the Chief Justice of Jammu & Kashmir High Court on 18 March 1994. He was transferred as Chief Justice of Andhra Pradesh High Court on 23 September 1994. He was appointed as Judge of the Supreme Court of India on 6 March 1995 and retired on 30 June 2000.

References 

Aligarh Muslim University alumni
1935 births
Living people